The 2020 European Rugby Champions Cup Final was the final match in the 2019–20 European Rugby Champions Cup, and the twenty-fifth European club rugby final in general. The final was held between first-time finalists Exeter Chiefs, and two-time runners-up Racing 92. Originally due to take place at the Stade Vélodrome in Marseille on 23 May, it was rescheduled to Ashton Gate in Bristol on 17 October due to the COVID-19 pandemic.

Background
Both Exeter and Racing entered into the 2020 final with significantly little championship pedigree compared to the finalists of the previous year's final, Saracens and Leinster, as neither team had yet won the tournament. Racing had appeared in two previous finals in 2016 and 2018, losing to Saracens and Leinster respectively, while Exeter hadn't previously reached the semi-finals. Exeter entered the final undefeated with a 31–31 away draw to Glasgow Warriors while Racing also had a 21–21 away draw with Munster but also with a 27–24 away loss to Saracens.

Exeter and Racing had never met in European competitions prior to the 2020 final.

Route to the final

Note: In all results below, the score of the finalist is given first (H: home; A: away).

Match

Summary
Drawn into pools 2 and 4 respectively, Exeter and Racing both finished at the top of their pool. Exeter finished on 27 points, winning five matches and drawing away to Glasgow Warriors. Racing finished on 23 points, winning four matches, drawing away to Munster and suffering defeat away to Saracens in their final pool match. Exeter qualified with a No. 2 seed for the knockout stage, while Racing captured the No. 5 seed. In the knockout stage, Exeter defeated No. 7 Northampton Saints (home) and No. 3 Toulouse (home), while Racing 92 defeated No. 4 Clermont (away) and No. 8 Saracens (home) en route to the final.

In the match, Exeter raced out to a 14–0 lead with tries by Luke Cowan-Dickie and Sam Simmonds in the 8th and 16th minutes respectively, with Joe Simmonds successful on both conversions. Four minutes later, Racing got on the board via Simon Zebo, but the conversion was not successful. Racing's Juan Imhoff scored another try in the 32nd minute, with Finn Russell making the conversion. Exeter responded in the final minute of the half with a try scored by Harry Williams and a conversion by Joe Simmonds, making the halftime score 21–12 in favour of Exeter.

The second half began quickly, as Racing's Simon Zebo found the try zone in three minutes and Exeter's Henry Slade did the same two minutes later. In the 50th minute, Camille Chat narrowed Exeter's lead to one score with a try, and Maxime Machenaud's subsequent conversion narrowed the score to 28–24. Machenaud made it a one-point contest in the 65th minute by scoring Racing's only penalty of the game. The next 15 minutes were the longest scoring drought of the match, as it remained 28–27 until the game's final moments. During this time however, tensions arose when Exeter's Tomas Francis was sin binned by referee Nigel Owens for a deliberate knock-on within their own 22, however a penalty of their own for not releasing permanently put them out of danger. Joe Simmonds's stoppage time penalty goal then all but ensured an Exeter victory, by the score of 31–27.

With the victory, Exeter Chiefs won their first European Champions Cup title, while Racing 92 fell in their third final in the last five years.

Details

Touch judges:
Mike Adamson (SRU)
Craig Evans (WRU)
Television Match Official:
Ian Davies (WRU)

References 

Final
2020
October 2020 sports events in the United Kingdom
Exeter Chiefs matches
Racing 92 matches
International rugby union competitions hosted by England
2019–20 in English rugby union
2019–20 in French rugby union
Rugby union events postponed due to the COVID-19 pandemic